Landsberg is a surname associated with the German noble Landsberg family. Notable people with the surname include:

 Agnes of Landsberg (12th-century–1266), German noblewoman
 Barthold Nicolai Landsberg (c.1668 – 1740) Norwegian military officer
 Berthold II of Landsberg (before 1464–1502), German bishop
 Clara Landsberg (1873–1966), American educator
 David Landsberg, American actor, writer, producer and director
 Eddie Landsberg (born 1971), Tokyo-based, Philadelphia-born jazz organist
 Ernst Landsberg, German jurist
 Georg Landsberg (1865–1912), German mathematician
 Grigory Landsberg, Soviet physicist
 Herrad of Landsberg (died 1195), Alsatian nun and abbess of Hohenburg Abbey in the Vosges mountains
 Hilary Landsberg (1834–1898), Polish cloth manufacturer
 Johan Landsberg (born 1974), Swedish tennis player
 John Justus of Landsberg (1489–1539), German Carthusian monk and ascetical writer
 Karl Landsberg (1890–1964), Swedish cyclist
 Klaus Landsberg (1916–1956), German-American electrical engineer, pioneer of television
 Leopold Landsberg (1861–1935), Jewish industrialist in Russia and Poland
 Marceli Landsberg (1890–1951), Polish physician, specialist in internal medicine and contagious diseases, professor of the Medical Academy in Lodz
 Meyer Landsberg (1810–1870), German rabbi
 Michael Landsberg (born 1957), Canadian sports journalist
 Michele Landsberg, Canadian writer
 Mort Landsberg (1919–1970), American NFL player
 Otto Landsberg (1869–1957), German jurist, politician and diplomat
 Paul-Louis Landsberg (1901–1944), German-Jewish existentialist philosopher
 Rolf Landsberg (1920–2003), German professor of physical chemistry
 William Landsberg (1915–2013), Brooklyn-born modernist architect
 Sophie of Landsberg (c. 1250–1318), German princess, member of the House of Wettin and by marriage Duchess of Glogów
 Theodoric of Landsberg (1242–1285), member of the House of Wettin, Margrave of Landsberg from 1265 until his death

See also
 Landsbergis, the Lithuanian variation of the name Landsberg

German-language surnames